Jackson City Hall, located in Jackson, Mississippi, is the seat of municipal government.

History
Originally constructed in 1846–47 at a cost of $8,000, the building was either enlarged or rebuilt in 1853-54 because of structural problems.

During the American Civil War, the building was used as a hospital and was left standing by Federal troops despite heavy damage inflicted on other buildings throughout Jackson.  Speculation was that General Sherman, a Freemason, spared the building because it housed a Masonic Lodge, though a more likely reason is that it housed an army hospital.

The building underwent extensive renovation in 1963–64, which was undertaken by architect Frank P. Gates.

In 1968, a statue of Andrew Jackson, made by Katherine Speed Ettl, wife of former Jackson mayor Leland Speed, was installed in front of the building. As of July 2020, the statue is slated for removal.

References

Antebellum architecture
Mississippi Landmarks
National Register of Historic Places in Jackson, Mississippi
City and town halls on the National Register of Historic Places in Mississippi
Greek Revival architecture in Mississippi